Vasilki is a rural locality (a village) in Pekshinskoye Rural Settlement, Petushinsky District, Vladimir Oblast, Russia. The population was 9 as of 2010.

Geography 
Vasilki is located 42 km northeast of Petushki (the district's administrative centre) by road. Aleksino is the nearest rural locality.

References 

Rural localities in Petushinsky District